Euptera semirufa is a butterfly in the family Nymphalidae. It is found in eastern and central Cameroon, Gabon, the Central African Republic and the Democratic Republic of the Congo (from the north-eastern part of the country to Ituri and Uele).

References

Butterflies described in 1921
Euptera